Abu Hamam is a Syrian town located in Abu Kamal District, Deir ez-Zor.  According to the Syria Central Bureau of Statistics, the town had a population of 21,947 in the 2004 census.

Syrian civil ear

Abu Hamam was captured by Syrian Democratic Forces on 1 December 2017.

On 3 March 2022, a fighter with the Syrian Democratic Forces was shot dead in the town by Islamic State gunmen.

On 3 June 2022, two fighters and a smuggler were killed after Syrian forces launched an anti-smuggling operation in the town.

References 

Populated places in Deir ez-Zor Governorate
Populated places on the Euphrates River